The Schiedam train disaster took place in the Netherlands on 4 May 1976 near the station Schiedam Rotterdam-West. The international Rhine Express boat train (D-train D215) from Hook of Holland, which left for Munich and was hauled by NS Class 1300 electric locomotive no. 1311 Best collided with a train of the then new sprinter type, (trainset 2008 of Stoptrein 4116) coming from Rotterdam. The collision caused the deaths of 24 people (in the forward carriage of the 2008), 5 severe casualties and several tens of less severely injured.

The disaster was the second major train crash near Schiedam, following the first major train accident in the Netherlands, which happened on 10 August 1856 and caused 3 deaths.

Further reading
 Duin, Menno Joost van. (1992) Van rampen leren : een vergelijkend onderzoek naar de lessen uit spoorwegongevallen, hotelbranden en industriële ongelukken. The Hague: Haagse Drukkerij en Uitgeversmij. .
 Jongerius, R.T. (1993) Spoorwegongevallen in Nederland, 1839-1993. Haarlem: Schuyt & Co. Part 22 of the book range of the NVBS. .

References

External links

 Schiedam train disaster at the Zwaailichten disaster website.
 Video of the disaster on NOS.nl.
 

Train collisions in the Netherlands
Railway accidents in 1976
1976 in the Netherlands
History of Schiedam
Accidents and incidents involving Nederlandse Spoorwegen
1976 disasters in the Netherlands